The thorny skate (Amblyraja radiata) is a species of fish in the family Rajidae.

Species description

Its underside is smooth, but the upper side, as the name suggests, is very rough with many small thorns all over and 13-17 larger ones in line from the back of the head to end of the tail. The top side is brown with possibly black spots and the underside is white. It has a hard, roughly triangular snout and a tail, which is shorter than its body. It eats crustaceans, small fishes, and worms. It produces egg capsules, which are 3.4-8.9 cm long and 2.3-6.8 cm wide, which hatch outside the body.

Conservation status
Thorny skate are taken as bycatch in some fisheries.  It is a U.S. National Marine Fisheries Service species of concern, which are those species about which the U.S. National Oceanic and Atmospheric Administration, National Marine Fisheries Service, has some concerns regarding status and threats, but for which insufficient information is available to indicate a need to list the species under the U.S. Endangered Species Act.

References

Kulka, D.W., Ellis, J., Anderson, B., Cotton, C.F., Derrick, D., Pacoureau, N. & Dulvy, N.K. 2020. Amblyraja radiata. The IUCN Red List of Threatened Species 2020: e.T161542A124503504. https://dx.doi.org/10.2305/IUCN.UK.2020-3.RLTS.T161542A124503504.en. Accessed on 20 March 2022.

External links
 Species Description of Amblyraja radiata at www.shark-references.com
 

Rajidae
Fish described in 1808